Assis is a city and a municipality in the southwestern part of the state of São Paulo in Brazil. The population is 105,087 (2020 est.) in an area of 460.61 km. The town was founded on July 5, 1905, and became a municipality in 1917, when it was separated from Platina. It is the largest city of its microregion, and the 2nd of its mesoregion, and is 434 km away from the capital, São Paulo. 
The town has an annual average temperature of 21,37 °C, annual rainfall , and the vegetation predominates Mata Atlântica and Cerrado, is then a transition zone of vegetation. Its Human Development Index (HDI) is 0.805, considered high if compared to state and is in 28th place among Brazilian cities.

The name Assis is a reference to Captain Assis, who explored the lands of the region. Is currently formed by the city of Assis, with its single district headquarters since Tarumã became a separate municipality in 1990.

The city is known for its title Fraternal City and the undergraduate courses from UNESP at Assis, FEMA (Municipal Assis Educational Foundation) and Unip (Universidade Paulista - Paulista University). In the city, there are many industries, schools, universities, large agriculture production and strong commerce and services. The city is the seat of the Roman Catholic Diocese of Assis. Assis is one of the most important of region and has a privileged geographic location where there are different types of agriculture. Furthermore, the city is served by Marcelo Pires Halzhausen State Airport. Assis is cropped by the railroad old Estrada de Ferro Sorocabana and by numerous highways connecting the main cities of the region, the states of Mato Grosso do Sul and Paraná

Furthermore, the city is regional development reference, with influence in the cities of Assis's Microregion, a few municipalities in the Ourinhos's Microregion, Marília's Microregion and North of Paraná by his commerce, services, cultural services, sports, science and technology that make Assis that bears the title of Capital of Paranapanema, even with strong competition from larger centers such as Marilia, Presidente Prudente and Londrina.

Administration and political

Mayor: Ricardo Pinheiro (2013/2016)

Assis is seat of Government Region State and of CIVAP - Consórcio Intermunicipal do Vale Paranapanema (Intermunicipal Consortium of Paranapanema Valley) what is an alliance of 25 cities in Paranapanema Region with 300k inhabitants.

Nascido em Assis, Thiago Cepa leva o nome da cidade para a mais importante capital do mundo. Thiago é responsável pela logística de Feltham, bairro onde nasceu e viveu Freddie Mercury.

Economy

The economy of the city is diverse with strong commerce and services participation, but with huge state participation. Like other cities of Brazil, its market isn't a free market. Has a huge regulations, taxes and other effects of huge Brazilian state. In the city are many marketplaces like Supermercados Avenida, Rede 20 Supermercados, Supermercados Amigão, Supermercados São Judas Tadeu and Walmart. The city was growing in IT, in the city was a huge number of IT companies (98 companies of IT is operating in Assis) like VSM, TOTVS Agroindústria, WebManagers, SE7I, ANGAZA, PENZE, ComunicarTI, Engemap and others.

Education

Assis has a system of state and private primary and secondary schools and a variety of vocational-technical schools. It's started in 1917 when Assis was transformed into a city. The first official and state school was Assis Isolated School (Escola Isolada de Assis), what was changed to Scholar Group of Assis (Grupo Escolar de Assis). After that, was created in 1941 the Assis Normal School (Escola Normal de Assis) with High School course and Normal course, that allowed the teacher formation.

In 1951 was created officially the Artesanal School of Assis (Escola Artesanal de Assis), that was changed into Industrial School of Assis, that nowadays is Assis's State Technical School "Pedro D'Arcádia Neto".

Furthermore, in 1956 the São Paulo State Legislature approved the Bill proposed by the House Representative Mr José Santilli Sobrinho who creates the Faculty of Philosophy, Sciences and Languages of Assis (Faculdade de Filosofia, Ciências e Letras de Assis) as an Institute for Higher Education. 
In 1959 was installed the course of Languages. Today the faculty is a part of multi-campus system of Universidade Estadual Paulista (Paulista State University) with name Faculty of Science and Languages of Assis (FCLA)

In the city are other universities like FEMA which was created by Assis's city hall (in other words, is a state university), but unlike Unesp the courses are not free and their students are required to pay tuition in all courses.

Educational institutions 
The universities and colleges include:

Health care

Assis has a large health care state and private system like Hospital Regional de Assis, the largest health care center of Mesoregion of Assis and reference in public health in this region. The city have a huge number of hospital around the city. Furthermore, the city has other hospitals like Santa Casa de Misericórdia de Assis and Hospital de Olhos Oeste Paulista (Hospital of Eyes of Paulista West), one of the best ophthalmological hospital in the country.

Transportation

Assis is the headquarters of the Departamento de Estradas e Rodagens de São Paulo (Departament of Roads of São Paulo), being the 7th Regional Division. It is responsible for managing state roads of Middle Paranapanema and part of the Marília's Mesoregion and Ourinhos's Microregion.
 Avenida/Rodovia Benedito Pires (Benedito Pires Highway/Avenue) - Connects Assis to Cândido Mota. Four-lane highway.
 SP-270 - Rodovia Raposo Tavares (Raposo Tavares Highway) - Connects Assis to Ourinhos, Presidente Prudente, São Paulo and others. From Ourinhos to Presidente Prudente is a freeway highway.
 SP-284 - Rodovia Manilo Gobbi (Manilo Gobbi Highway) - Connects Assis to Paraguaçu Paulista 
 SP-333 - Rodovia Rachid Rayes (Rachid Rayes Highway) - Connects Assis to Marília and Bauru
 SP-333 - Rodovia Miguel Jubran (Miguel Jubran Highway) - Connects Assis to Tarumã, Florínia and Paraná State (old Assis - Londrina Highway). Assis to Tarumã is a freeway highway.

The city is served by Assis Airport.

References

External links

  Assis City Hall Website
  Assis City Council Website

 
1917 establishments in Brazil
Populated places established in 1917